The Chin-Lushai Expedition of 1889-90 was a British punitive expedition in Burma and India against the tribes of the Chin Hills and Lushai Hills.

Background 
Following the Lushai Expedition of 1871-72, the border regions of Burma and India remained relatively peaceful with few raids occurring. In 1888 however raids become more frequent, and in February 1889, Lieutenant Stewart of the British Army and his surveying party were murdered by Chin tribesmen, and the government was determined to stop the raids.

Throughout  the  summer  of  1889  the  Political  Officer  kept  up negotiations  with  the  Soktes  and  Siyins,  but  though  they  surrendered a  large  number  of  Burman  captives,  they  continued  to give  trouble  by  cutting  the  telegraph  wires,  ambushing  convoys, and  firing  into  the  British  posts.  These  facts,  coupled  with  the advisability  of  thoroughly  exploring  and  opening  out  the  narrow strip  of  country  which  alone  now  divided  British  Burma  from India,  led  to  the  undertaking,  in  the  cold  weather  of  1889–90,  of military  operations  from  Burma and  Chittagong  into  the  country of  the  Chins  and  Lushais.

Order of Battle

Campaign
The  expedition  advanced  on  November 15, 1889,  in  two  columns,  Brigadier-General Symons  proceeding against  the  Chin tribes,  and  Colonel  Tregear  against  the Lushai Tribes.  The  little  forces  had  to  make  their  way through  the  roadless  and  pestilent  jungle,  which  caused many troops to die  from  disease. 

From the book - Frontier and Overseas Expeditions from India: 

To the Northern column were assigned the duties of continuing and completing the subjugation and pacification of the Siyin, Sagyilaing, and Kanhow tribes of Chins, and of operating against the Tashons in conjunction with the Southern Column. The task of Brigadier-General Symons as Commander of the Southern Column was: 
 First - To  drive  a  mule  road  through  the  heart  of  the  Baungshe Chin  country  to  Yokwa  and  Haka,  subjugating  these  tribes  as he  advanced;  and  obtaining  the  restoration  of  captives.
 Second — To advance in combination with the Northern column to the capital of the Tashon Chins and compel their submission.
 Third — To advance west from Haka, and, in co-operation with the Chittagong Column, complete the opening of the road between Bengal and Burma, coercing the tribes, and obtaining submission to our authority on both sides of the line of advance.
 Fourth — To visit villages; force the Chins to cease raiding and give up all captives; to explore the Chin Hills in every direction as far as the limits of time and the working season would permit.
 Fifth — To establish the necessary posts to hold the country after the withdrawal of the main body of the troops.

General Symons assumed command of the Burma Columns, Chin-Lushai Field Force on November 15, 1889, and about this time the preparations for the expedition were in the following state: 
The Southern Column had concentrated at Pakokku for its march of 165 miles to Kan. On account of the unusually late rains the start of the expedition had been put off until November 23rd. The Northern Column was ready at Fort White, and only awaited the arrival of its hill coolies. It had been decided to establish ten posts along the western portion  of the Burma frontier for its protection against Chin raids. All the garrisons for these posts were sent up the Chindwin river to Kalewa. The late rains had flooded the Kale valley, and up to the end of November the country was impassable to anything but elephants. The energies of the officers, however, overcame all difficulties, and by the end of December these ten posts were constructed, occupied, and rationed.

The rationing of Kan, however, the head-quarters of the Southern Column, was one of the greatest difficulties with which the General had to contend. Kan was 165 miles by road from Pakkoku, the main base, and on the 23rd of November, owing to the floods, carts could only travel sixty miles of this distance. A small river, the Myittha, connected Kan to  Kalewa on the Chindwin, but it was very shallow and swift, full of rocks, and generally difficult of navigation. Owing to the difficulties of land transport, however, Lieutenant Holland, of the Indian Marine, explored the 136 miles of this river between Kan and Kalewa, and pronounced that it would be possible to send stores up by this route. This form of  transport was accordingly adopted, and, under the supervision of Lieutenant Holland, was worked with conspicuous success until the end of January, when the river became too shallow for navigation. During February the transport officers had to meet a fresh difficulty in cattle-disease, which broke out with great virulence in the Kale and Myittha valleys, and through which the number of pack bullocks available was reduced by two-thirds. The first troops of the Southern Column reached Kan on the 7th December, and the Sappers of the party began work on the road to Yokwa and Haka the next day.

Before the expedition started it was believed that the Southern Column would be able to reach Haka in at the most twelve days from Kan, and all calculations were made on this surmise. Such, however, were the unexpected difficulties of the country that, with the whole strength of the force devoted to making the road, sixty-four miles in length, it took  the head of the column sixty-six days to get into Haka, while the mule road was not completed until the seventy-seventh day from commencing the work. This disappointing delay was  not without its compensating advantages in dealing with the Chins. They expected us to make a quick advance, do some damage, and then retire. The steady persistent advance, together with the pains taken to get into touch with them, and to explain our objects and intentions, paralysed their efforts for resistance, and thus tribe after tribe submitted and yielded to our terms. 

The Chins first met with by the Southern Column were the Yokwas of the Baungshe tribe. From the outset it was resolved to try a lenient policy with the Southern Chins, who before  these operations had not come into contact with us. After one poor attempt by the Yokwas at opposition to our advance on the 28th of December, near Taungtek, when they acknowledged to having had 500 men and 300 guns against us, and to having sustained a great defeat, they gave up all hope of keeping us out of their hills. On the 8th of January two Yokwa Chins came into camp, and from this date onwards we were never again out of touch with the tribes. The objects of our coming, and our terms, were carefully explained  to these two men, and they were dismissed to repeat them to their chiefs, who formally surrendered shortly after. The next day Lieutenant Foster and two other officers were strolling outside the camp when they were suddenly fired at by a few Thetta men in ambush, and Lieutenant Foster was shot dead. In consequence of this the nearest village, Lamtok, was burnt. Having dealt with the Yokwas, the column moved on Haka as soon as the mule path was sufficiently forward, arriving there on the 13th February. The same procedure as that adopted with the Yokwas obtained the full submission of the important Haka community; and the surrender of these two tribes was virtually equivalent to the submission of the whole Baungshe country.

Having destroyed  the  enemy's  villages  and  crops for many months,  and  captured a  few  stockades,  the  chiefs  of  the  tribes believe surrender was necessary, and on April 30, 1890, the expedition was ended and disbanded.

Aftermath

The British and Indian soldiers involved in the campaign were awarded the India General Service Medal with the clasp Chin Lushai 1889-90.

Col Symons, Col Tregear and Brigade Surgeon Edward Corrigan Markey were appointed Companions of the Order of the Bath (CB) for their service during the campaign, and the following were appointed Companions of the Distinguished Service Order:-

Lieutenant-Colonel and Colonel Richard Westmacott, Bombay Staff Corps.
Lieutenant-Colonel and Colonel George John Skinner, Bengal Staff Corps.
Surgeon-Major William Heed Murphy, Indian Medical Service, Bengal.
Captain Arthur George Frederic Browne, Bengal Staff Corps.
Surgeon Frederick Arthur Rogers, Indian Medical Service, Bengal.
Captain John Shakespear, the Prince of Wales's Leinster Regiment (Royal Canadians).
Lieutenant Arthur Henry Morris, the Royal Irish Regiment.
Lieutenant Edward James Lugard, Bengal Staff Corps.
Gerald Edward Holland, First Grade Officer of Her Majesty's Indian Marine.

J.W.P. Peters served in the expedition as a Lieutenant on special service from the 7th Dragoon Guards.

References

1889 in India
1890 in India